The German Minority Electoral Committee is an electoral committee in Poland, that represents the German minority. Since 2008, its representative has been Ryszard Galla.

It is not a registered political party, but an organization by which Poland's political system gives political representation to national minorities. Candidates of the German minority are proposed by the Social-Cultural Association of Germans in Opolitian Silesia (Towarzystwo Społeczno-Kulturalne Niemców na Śląsku Opolskim) and the Social-Cultural Association of Germans in Silesian Voivodeship (Towarzystwo Społeczno-Kulturalne Niemców Województwa Śląskiego).

Programme
German Minority supports Polish integration with the European Union and the development of the region of Silesia, and argues for laws supportive of minority groups (in particular, the German minority in Poland).

National elections
As an organisation representing a national minority, it is not required to pass the election threshold of 5% as standard political parties in Poland are.
	
In 1993 there were two lists, one in the Opole Voivodeship, one in the Katowice Voivodeship. The Opole list also won one seat in the Senate.

At the 2007 Parliamentary elections the candidate list to the Sejm (Polish parliament) got 8.81% of the votes in Opole Voivodeship, and only one seat in the Sejm, Ryszard Galla (8,193 votes). He had already won a seat in 2005 and had announced the rise from 2 to 3 seats as an electoral goal early in September, thanks to the personal votes of local mayors who were supposed to reinforce the list. The second former Sejm deputy, Henryk Kroll (7,897 votes), lost his seat and announced his resignation from the chairmanship of the Social-Cultural Association of Germans in Silesian Opole, whose delegates are due to elect a new president early 2008. The 3 candidate list for the Senate of Poland didn't succeed in winning a single seat. According to the bilingual weekly Schlesisches Wochenblatt, votes won by the German Minority list could have benefited the Civic Platform (PO), for whom 6,000 to 8,000 ethnic Germans would have voted.

In 2011 the list got 8.76% of valid votes in the Opole constituency, and more than 20% in 3 powiat (Krapkowice County, Opole County and Strzelce County) out of 12. Ryszard Galla was reelected as the sole MP from the German Minority with 11,794 personal votes.

Regional elections
Local elections to the Opole Regional Assembly:

Notes

References

Bibliography

External links
 

1990 establishments in Poland
Christian democratic parties in Poland
Conservative parties in Poland
German diaspora in Poland
German political parties in Poland
Political parties established in 1990
Regionalist parties
Pro-European political parties in Poland
Upper Silesia